Catherine Smith Blakespear (born February 26, 1976) is an American politician who is currently serving in the California State Senate. She is a Democrat representing the 38th Senate District, which encompasses the Northern San Diego County and Southern Orange County region.

Business career 
Reporter for the LA Times in 1994. Followed by becoming an AP reporter.

Prior to her time in elected office, Blakespear was an estate planning attorney

Political career 
Prior to her election to the State Senate, Blakespear served on the Encinitas city council (2014) and then 3 terms as mayor of the city (December 2016 thru November 2022)

while Mayor of Encinitas, Blakespear served as chair of SANDAG

Education 
Graduated in 1994 Northwestern University in Chicago where she earned a BA, and MA degree in Journalism

Law school JD University of Utah S.J. Quinney College of Law 2006

Personal life 
Catherine and husband Jeremy reside in Encintias. They have 2 children

References

External links 
 
 
 Campaign website
 Join California Catherine Blakespear

Democratic Party California state senators
California city council members
21st-century American politicians
Northwestern University alumni
Living people
1976 births
S.J. Quinney College of Law alumni